Nelson Bay is a rural locality in the local government area (LGA) of Circular Head in the North-west and west LGA region of Tasmania. The 2016 census recorded a population of 4 for the state suburb of Nelson Bay.

History 
Nelson Bay is a confirmed locality.

Geography
The Southern Ocean forms the western boundary, and Tiger Creek forms the northern. The Nelson Bay River flows through from east to west.

Road infrastructure 
Route C214 (Temma Road) runs through from north to south.

References

Towns in Tasmania
Localities of Circular Head Council